Qarababa or Karababa may refer to:
Qarababa, Nakhchivan, Azerbaijan
Qarababa, Zangilan, Azerbaijan
Karababa, Çınar, Turkey
Karababa, Araban, Turkey